These are the list of programs broadcast by GMA Pinoy TV.

Note: Program titles are listed in alphabetical order followed by the year it debuted in parentheses. Programs are aired on all GMA Pinoy TV feeds except when noted.

Current programming

Newscast
 24 Oras 
 24 Oras News Alert 
 24 Oras Weekend 
 Saksi 
 Unang Hirit

Drama
Anthology
 Daig Kayo ng Lola Ko 
 Magpakailanman 
 Regal Studio Presents 
 Tadhana 
 Wish Ko Lang 
Series
 AraBella 
 Abot-Kamay na Pangarap 
 Hearts on Ice 
 Mga Lihim ni Urduja 
 Underage

Variety
 All-Out Sundays 
 Eat Bulaga! 
 TiktoClock

Comedy
 Bubble Gang 
 Daddy's Gurl 
 Happy Together 
 Pepito Manaloto: Tuloy na Kuwento

Reality
 The Clash

Talk
 The Boobay and Tekla Show  
 Fast Talk with Boy Abunda

Documentary / magazine
 I-Witness 
 Imbestigador 
 Kapuso Mo, Jessica Soho 
 Reporter's Notebook 
 The Atom Araullo Specials

Informative
 Born to be Wild

Game
 Family Feud

Film and special presentation
 GMA Pinoy Blockbuster 
 Rubia Servios

International programs
 ACTS
 Extra-Natural
 Fil-Am Now
 Global Pinoy Unlimited 
 Overseas Filipino Witness (O.F.W.)
 Pinoy Indie on GMA Pinoy TV 
 Pusong Pinoy Sa Amerika 
 Value Added Treasures
 Women of Worth

Religious
 The 700 Club Asia 
 Family TV Mass

Upcoming programs

Previous programs

List of international programs previously aired by GMA Pinoy TV
 All in the Family with Dr. Tess
 The Balikbayan Show with the Bascos
 Barkada
 Becoming Pinoy
 Doraemon
 The Dr. Tess Show 
 Fight For Love (Parts 1 and 2)
 Full House 
 Home Away from Home 
 Hot Seat
 KMG: Kaya Mong Gawin
 Life...Pinoy Style
 Make it Happen with The Design Proposal 
 Philippine Volcanoes
 Pinoy A+ 
 Pinoy Abroad FunConnect 
 Power Ng Pinoy Review Philippines 
 Team Pilipinas World Premiere''

Notes

References

Lists of television series by network